Jon Carter Kent (born 7 May 1979) is a South African cricketer.  He has played two One Day Internationals in 2002. He retired from formative cricket in 2011 after being released from his Dolphins cricket team contract.

References
 Cricinfo page on Jon Kent

1979 births
Living people
South African cricketers
South Africa One Day International cricketers
Dolphins cricketers
KwaZulu-Natal cricketers
Scotland cricketers
Cricketers from Cape Town